Cantaloupe Music is a Brooklyn-based record label that produces and releases contemporary classical music and other forms of avant-garde music. The label was founded in 2001 by Michael Gordon, David Lang, Julia Wolfe, and Kenny Savelson. Gordon, Lang, and Wolfe are composers who founded the Bang on a Can music festival in New York City, while Savelson has worked as the festival's music director. Cantaloupe Music is distributed by Naxos in North America and worldwide by Naxos Global Logistics.

Partial roster

 Alarm Will Sound
 Alex Weiser
 Annie Gosfield
 Arnold Dreyblatt
 Asphalt Orchestra
 Bang on a Can
 Bobby Previte
 Brian Eno
 Burkina Electric
 Dan Trueman
 David Lang
 Dominic Frasca
 Don Byron
 ETHEL
 Evan Ziporyn
 Glenn Kotche
 gutbucket
 Icebreaker
 Iva Bittová
 John Cage
 John Luther Adams
 Julia Wolfe
 Ken Thomson
 Kronos Quartet
 Laurie Anderson
 Lisa Moore
 Maya Beiser
 Michael Gordon
 Michael Harrison
 Paquito D'Rivera
 Phil Kline
 Philip Glass
 So Percussion
 Steve Reich
 Terry Riley

See also 
 List of record labels

References

External links
 Official site

American record labels
Record labels established in 2001
Experimental music record labels
Jazz record labels